Patrick S. Martin is an American politician serving as a member of the West Virginia Senate from the 12th district. Elected in November 2020, he assumed office on December 1, 2020, succeeding incumbent Democrat Doug Facemire.

Martin lives in Jane Lew, West Virginia. He also serves as the vice chair of the Senate Economic Development Committee.

References 

Living people
Republican Party West Virginia state senators
People from Lewis County, West Virginia
Year of birth missing (living people)